Suzanne L. Marchand (born 1961) is an American intellectual and cultural historian of modern Europe. She is the Boyd Professor of European Intellectual History at Louisiana State University.

Life
After earning a B.A. at University of California, Berkeley, Marchand moved to the University of Chicago, where she received her M.A. and Ph.D. degrees. She then proceeded to Princeton University, as assistant and later associate professor. Having transitioned to Louisiana State University, she served as associate and full professor before becoming Boyd Professor, the highest rank within the LSU system. She also loves porcelain, the subject of her third book.

Professional activities
Marchand has been a member of numerous boards and committees. Previously, she sat on the editorial boards of Central European History and Journal of Modern History as well as the executive boards of the German Studies Association, Central European History, and Friends of the German Historical Institute, Washington, DC, among others. Currently, she serves on the editorial boards of Modern Intellectual History, Journal for Art Historiography, German History, Anabases: Traditions et réceptions de l'antiquité, and Palgrave Studies in Cultural and Intellectual History. She has also performed duties for the Mellon Foundation, Fulbright Program, Nieman Foundation for Journalism at Harvard University, the Shannon Prize of Notre Dame University, Consortium on the Revolutionary Era, American Historical Association, and American Council of Learned Societies. She has also acted as vice-president and president of the German Studies Association.

Honors and awards
In the course of her career, Marchand has received grants and fellowships from the Humboldt Foundation, American Council of Learned Societies (Frederick Burkhardt Residential Fellowship), and Louisiana Board of Regents. She has been fellow at the Wissenschaftskolleg in Berlin (2000–01), Collegium Budapest (Institute for Advanced Study) in Budapest (2009), and Max Planck Institut für Wissenschaftsgechichte in Berlin (2013). In 2010, Marchand received the American Historical Association's George L. Mosse Prize for the Best Book in Cultural and Intellectual History for German Orientalism in the Age of Empire: Religion, Race, and Scholarship, which was published in the "Publications of the German Historical Institute" series. In 2022, she was honoured with the prestigious Guggenheim Fellowship in recognition of her scholarship in the field of German cultural and intellectual history.

Selected publications

References

Princeton University faculty
University of California, Berkeley alumni
University of Chicago alumni
Louisiana State University faculty
21st-century American historians
Living people
1961 births